Ivano Marescotti (born 4 February 1946) is an Italian actor.

Life and career 
Born in Villanova di Bagnacavallo, province of Ravenna, Marescotti long worked as a clerk in the urban sector of the Councillorship of Ravenna. He started acting just at 35 years old, first in local amateur stage works, then in some major stage companies.

In films, after some small film roles Marescotti had his breakout role in 1991 as Tobia the chemist in the Silvio Soldini's comedy film L'aria serena dell'ovest. From then Marescotti started appearing in dozens of films, usually in supporting roles, establishing himself as one of the most active character actors in the Italian cinema of the 1990s and 2000s. In recent years, he also took part to several international productions.

In 2004 he won a Silver Ribbon for the short film Assicurazione sulla vita. In 2007 he was elected in Bologna to the regional constituent assembly of the Democratic Party.

Selected filmography 

 The Belt (1989)
 The Peaceful Air of the West (1990) 
 Especially on Sunday (1991)
 Johnny Stecchino (1991)
 The Invisible Wall (1991) 
 Gangsters (1992)
 Benito (1993)
The Long Silence (1993)
 The Monster (1994)
 Dichiarazioni d'amore (1994)
 Mario and the Magician (1994)
 Weird Tales (1994)
 Who Killed Pasolini? (1995)
 Luna e l'altra (1996)
 Vesna Goes Fast (1996)
 Jack Frusciante Left the Band (1996) 
 Bits and Pieces (1996)
 Commercial Break (1997)
 The Talented Mr. Ripley (1999)
 Holy Tongue (2000)
 20 - Venti (2000)
 Brazilero (2001)
 Hannibal (2001)
 The Legend of Al, John and Jack (2002)
 King Arthur (2004)
 The Wind, in the Evening (2004)
 Raccontami (2006) 
 Il Pirata: Marco Pantani (2007)
 The Right Distance (2007)
 Lessons in Chocolate (2007)
 Fort Apache Napoli (2009)
 Cado dalle nubi (2009)
 What a Beautiful Day (2011) 
 The Perfect Life (2011) 
 Vacanze di Natale a Cortina (2011)
 Them Who? (2015)
 There's No Place Like Home (2018)

References

External links 

 

1946 births
People from the Province of Ravenna
Italian male stage actors
Italian male film actors
Italian male television actors
Living people
Nastro d'Argento winners